Jennifer Owen is a British zoologist.

Career
Jennifer Bak was the daughter of F. A. Bak, a noted amateur ornithologist and Leicester based textile manufacturer. She went on to study zoology in Oxford where, in 1955 as an undergraduate, she met Denis Owen. They married after graduation in 1958 and she went to the University of Michigan to work as a teaching fellow and complete a research PhD on the study of wasps. After the doctorate Owen took up teaching positions from 1962 in Makerere University, Uganda and Fourah Bay College, Sierra Leone as well as Sweden. On her return to the department of zoology with University of Leicester in 1971 she noticed the huge number of insects in her garden in the United Kingdom compared to those in Africa and the study began.

Owen achieved the recording of ninety-one of the 256 species of hover flies in Britain in fourteen years. In thirty years of study she recorded 2,204 insect species in her own garden while also finding 20 species new to Britain and six which were previously undescribed. She wrote a book on the study, Wildlife of a Garden: A Thirty-Year Study. As well as the insects she counted Owen grew over 400 different plant species to determine the best food for the insects being tracked. 

The garden, and home of Owen is in Leicester. She worked as a zoology museum curator and university lecturer, however she is now a wheelchair user due to the impact of multiple sclerosis.

Owen won the Veitch Memorial Medal for outstanding contribution to the advancement and improvement of the science and practice of horticulture in 2010.

Personal life
Owen had a son and a daughter with Denis Owen. They divorced in 1994.

Publications
Owen, J. 1975. Suburban Gardens: England's Most Important Nature Reserve? 
Owen, J. 1982. Feeding Strategy. University of Chicago Press  
Owen, J. 1984. Mysteries and Marvels of Insect Life. EDC Publishing   
Owen, J. 1991. The Ecology of a Garden: The First Fifteen Years. Cambridge University Press 
Owen, J. 2010. Wildlife of a Garden: A Thirty-year Study. Royal Horticultural Society

References

Year of birth uncertain
20th-century British zoologists
Alumni of the University of Oxford
English ecologists
Women ecologists
English non-fiction writers
University of Michigan alumni
English women writers
Living people
Veitch Memorial Medal recipients
20th-century British women scientists
Year of birth missing (living people)